The 2004–05 Greek Basket League season was the 65th season of the Greek Basket League, the highest tier professional basketball league in Greece. It was also the 13th season of Greek Basket League that was regulated by HEBA (ESAKE). The winner of the league was Panathinaikos, which beat AEK Athens in the league's playoff's finals series. The clubs MENT and Ionikos Nea Filadelfeia were relegated to the Greek A2 League. The top scorer of the league was Nikos Oikonomou, a player of Panionios.

Teams

Regular season

Source: esake.gr, galanissportsdata.com

Playoffs

The finals

Final standings

References

External links
 Official HEBA Site
 Official Hellenic Basketball Federation Site
 HEBA Site, season 2004/05
  Galanis Sports Data

Greek Basket League seasons
1
Greek